Kerb painting is the painting of road kerbs, usually to declare the affiliation of an area.  It is most commonly associated with Northern Ireland where it is used by both unionists and nationalists to mark territory.  It is an offence to paint kerbs in Northern Ireland, though there have been few prosecutions.  Highways authorities have trialled the use of plastic paint-resistant kerbs to counter the problem.

Northern Ireland 
Kerb painting is used in Northern Ireland by members of the unionist and nationalist communities.  It is used to mark territories and boundaries and declare the sectarian affiliations of residents, in a similar fashion to sectarian murals.  Street lights, litter bins and roundabout chevron stones have also been painted.  Unionists use the colours of red, white and blue from the British Union flag, and nationalists the green, white and orange of the Irish tricolour.

Painting of kerbs increases during the annual marching season.  They are a source of annoyance for some residents of both political allegiances.  There is an adage in Northern Ireland that one should never buy a house in a street where kerbs are painted, and the practice is said to have an adverse impact on local house prices.  Leading Northern Ireland political parties Sinn Féin (nationalist) and the Democratic Unionist Party have both stated that they oppose the practice of kerb painting.

Kerb painting is prohibited by the Roads (Northern Ireland) Order 1993 and punishable by a fine of up to £500, though offenders are rarely prosecuted.  Highways authorities have the right to remove or replace affected items.  Occasionally council workers tasked with restoring the kerbs to their original, neutral colours have been prevented from doing so by residents.  Kerb painting has been treated by the Police Service of Northern Ireland as a sectarian hate crime.  This is somewhat rare, as to be classified as such the person making the crime report must perceive themselves to have been targeted as a result of their beliefs.

Paint resistant kerbs 
Paint resistant plastic kerbs have been developed for the Northern Ireland market.  These are made from recycled plastics and can be cleaned of paint by a road sweeper. The Roads Service carried out a trial of the products from 2005 and since then 15 councils have also used the product, though there has been no large scale replacement of existing kerbs.

Elsewhere 

Kerbs in Granby Street in Liverpool have been painted in the Rastafarian colours of green, yellow and black.  Some highway authorities in America including those in California, Honolulu and Salt Lake City have painted kerbs to denote parking or waiting restrictions.  For example, in California, red kerbs denote fire lanes, where vehicle parking is prohibited.  Painted kerbs have also been used to denote no parking restrictions in the approach to crosswalks.  

Across the US the painting of house numbers on road kerbs is relatively common.  It can be run as a business and as a fundraiser for non-profit organisations.  In some cases the practice is illegal, the kerb being considered the property of the highway authority.

References 

Political art
Politics of Northern Ireland